The E.E. Hooten House is a historic house at 400 Arkansas Highway 25 in Guy, Arkansas.  It is a single story rectangular wood-frame structure, its exterior finished in veneered stone and cream-colored brick.  A gabled porch projects from the front, sheltering the main entrance, and featuring stone supports rising to rounded arch openings.  The house was probably built in the 1930s, but is notable for the applied stone veneer, which is the work of Silas Owens Sr., a prominent local mason known for his distinctive styles of stone and brickwork.

The house was listed on the National Register of Historic Places in 2005.

See also
National Register of Historic Places listings in Faulkner County, Arkansas

References

Houses on the National Register of Historic Places in Arkansas
Houses completed in 1935
Houses in Faulkner County, Arkansas